The Indian Youth Climate Network (IYCN) is a youth organization in India that aims to raise the voice of Indian youth on the global platform, as South Asia is one of the most vulnerable regions affected by climate change and environmental issues. Further, IYCN is motivated by global need in the Indian context to adopt mitigation and adaptation policy measure to combat climate change. 

IYCN members work to generate consensus on what role India should play in the global debate of climate change, and how it should address its domestic issues.

Started in 2008, IYCN was registered as an NGO in 2009 and today IYCN has offices in six locations with chapters in the Indian states, having outreach to thousands of youth in colleges, schools, corporations and institutions in India.

IYCN has "informed youth" as its leaders and program members who:
 Follow environmental and climate change policies and make recommendations at state, national and international platforms.
 Run campaigns aimed at public awareness on climate change impact & causes. In this process, the chapters mobilise and informing thousands of Indian citizens.
 Implement projects such as composting and community waste management, rural energy projects, lake clean-ups, and herbal and medicine gardens.

IYCN works at three levels:
  As a network of individuals enabling people to come together and work at a grassroots level, to form friendships and support each other.
  As a network of partner and supporter groups who bring together their strengths and passion for environment and sustainable development.
  As an organisation that runs its own programs/projects as well as participates in and supports programs/campaigns of other organisations.

Chapters
The Indian Youth Climate Network (IYCN) has several chapters across India.

Projects
The organization has been working on the following initiatives.
 Agents of Change
 Rural Energy Project
 Climate Leadership Program
 Campus Climate Challenge
 Climate Solutions Road Tour

Climate Solutions Road Tour January 2, 2009 – February 4, 2009
Climate Solutions Road Tour flagged off at Chennai, India, January 2, 2009. All over India traveling to more than 15 cities where a group of 10 members of the Indian Youth Climate Network and a solar powered band "Solar Punch" are traveling 3500 kilometers in solar plug-in electric cars, solar punch buggy and alternative-fueled truck. The road tour is one of the first initiatives towards sharing solutions in clean technology showcases, empowering youth in leadership training programs, and using art, dance and music by Solar Punch and other local musicians and artists to communicate the message.	
The objective of the tour has been defined as "To document a trail across the nation of climate solutions and empower youth along the route to create, communicate and celebrate their own solutions."
The road tour which began in Chennai on January 2, 2009, has covered 15 major cities including Bangalore, Hyderabad, Pune, Mumbai, Ahmedabad and Jaipur through to Delhi,
The tour ended on 5 February 2009, at Delhi.

Agents of Change
The program aims to send a delegation of Indian Young people which will strive to engage government delegations from around the world in policy, help build consensus amongst civil society groups and assist in the construction of a global youth climate network. 

Climate Leadership Program
The program aims to produce a group of youth who would lead grassroots climate groups in their communities; leaders who will organize and mobilize people; and leaders who will spread the message about the urgency of climate change. The Leadership Training for Campus Climate Changers is a full day interactive session on climate change, beginning with basic climate science and solutions and moving quickly into brainstorming on campus solutions, creating action plans for implementation, and media training to communicate successes.

Rural Energy Project
The aim is to create a clean technology project in rural India that will reduce greenhouse gases, and work towards reducing the heating of the planet. The first rural energy project of IYCN is going to be implemented in the south Indian state of Tamil Nadu in a village called MGR Nagar on the outskirts of Coimbatore.

See also 
Australian Youth Climate Coalition
Canadian Youth Climate Coalition
Energy Action Coalition
UK Youth Climate Coalition
Youth Climate Movement

References

External links
 Indian Youth Climate Network
 Climate India Solutions
 Solar Punch

Climate change in India
Climate change organizations
Environmental organisations based in India
Youth empowerment organizations
Youth-led organizations
Youth organisations based in India